Intermarket Bank was a commercial bank in Zambia. The bank is one of the commercial banks licensed by the Bank of Zambia, the national banking regulator.

History
In March 2010, at the direction of the Bank of Zambia, Afriland First Bank Group, based in Yaoundé, Cameroon, acquired 80% shareholding in Intermarket Bank, for an undisclosed sum of money. Sabre Capital, the former majority shareholders in Intermarket Bank retained 20% ownership. Afriland also took 80% shareholding in Intermarket Securities, which is 100% owned by Intermarket Bank. The new majority owners will keep the Intermarket brand until 2013 when they will switch to the Afriland brand. with liabilities in excess of the assets, it became potentially difficult for the bank to honour its financial obligations.

Ownership
, the bank's stock was owned by the following corporate entities:

Branch network
The bank maintained headquarters in Lusaka, Zambia's capital and largest city. The bank had the following branches:

 Lusaka Main Branch - Lusaka
 Manda Hill Branch - Manda Hill Shopping Mall, Lusaka
 New Soweto Branch - New Soweto, Lusaka
 NIPA Agency Branch - Lusaka
 Kamwala Branch - Kamwala
 Chawama Branch - Chawama
 Kitwe Branch - Kitwe

Governance
Joseph Toubi served as Afriland First Bank Group's Executive Vice President since 2008. He has been in the banking sector since 1989. After implementing the Organization Department and the Department in charge of Overheads management in Société Générale de Banques au Cameroun, Joseph Toubi joined Afriland First Bank Cameroon as an Internal Auditor in 1997. He was Advisor to the Chairman of Afriland First Group for 9 years before becoming the Group Executive Vice President in charge of Business Development and International Relations. He was also the Chairman of the Board of Afriland First Bank in the Democratic Republic of Congo and Chairman of the Board of Intermarket Banking Corporation. He was part of the team of four experts set up by the Cameroonian Government to implement the Douala Stock Exchange in 2002. Robert Nkous served as the Managing Director of Intermarket Banking Corporation, since January 2012.

Closure
In 2016, the Bank of Zambia seized and closed Intermarket Bank on account of being insolvent and unable to meet its financial obligations. In February 2017, the central bank announced that it would re-structure the collapsed bank, to enable it to re-open.

After reaching agreements with the shareholders of the collapsed bank, the restructured bank was opened, with new shareholders and under new management, on 23 October 2018.The restructured bank was named Zambia Industrial Commercial Bank.

See also
 Afriland First Bank
 Bank of Zambia
 List of banks in Zambia
 Economy of Zambia

External links
 Website of Bank of Zambia 
 Website of Afriland First Bank

References

Banks of Zambia
Companies based in Lusaka